Worcestershire County Cricket Club is one of eighteen first-class county clubs within the domestic cricket structure of England and Wales. It represents the historic county of Worcestershire. Its Vitality Blast T20 team has been rebranded the Worcestershire Rapids, but the county is known by most fans as 'the Pears'. The club is based at New Road, Worcester. Founded in 1865, Worcestershire held minor status at first and was a prominent member of the early Minor Counties Championship in the 1890s, winning the competition three times. In 1899, the club joined the County Championship and the team was elevated to first-class status. Since then, Worcestershire have played in every top-level domestic cricket competition in England.

Honours

First XI honours
 County Championship (5) – 1964, 1965, 1974, 1988, 1989
Division Two (1) – 2003, 2017
 Gillette/NatWest/C&G/Friends Provident Trophy (1) – 1994
 Vitality T20 Blast (1) – 2018
 Sunday/Pro 40 League (4) – 1971, 1987, 1988, 2007
 Benson & Hedges Cup (1) – 1991
 Minor Counties Championship (3) – 1896, 1897, 1898; shared (1) – 1895

Second XI honours
 Second XI Championship (3) – 1962, 1963, 1982 Second XI Trophy (1) – 2004

History
Earliest cricket
Cricket may have been played in Worcestershire during the 18th century, however the earliest reference to cricket in the county is 1829 and the county cricket club was not formed until 1865.

A match on 28 August 1844 at Hartlebury Common between Worcestershire and Shropshire is the earliest known instance of a county team in Worcestershire. Two years later, XXII of Worcestershire played William Clarke's All-England Eleven at Powick Hams.

Origin of the club
Worcestershire CCC was formed on 4 March 1865 at the Star Hotel in Worcester.

The club owes much to Paul Foley who was from a family of iron masters in Stourbridge.  He also owned an agricultural estate at Stoke Edith in Herefordshire.  He became involved with the club in the 1880s and helped to establish the Minor Counties Championship which began in 1895.  Worcestershire shared the inaugural title with Durham and Norfolk before winning outright in 1896, 1897 and 1898.

With this success behind it, the club applied for first-class status and entered the County Championship in 1899. Worcestershire CCC played its initial first-class match versus Yorkshire CCC on 4, 5 & 6 May 1899.

The first-class county
The inclusion of Worcestershire increased the County Championship to 15 teams.  At first they performed moderately despite the superb batting of Tip Foster, who could rarely play after 1901. Weak bowling on perfect New Road pitches was responsible for this, but in 1907 when Tip Foster played regularly for three months their batting, considering the difficulty of the pitches, was among the finest of any county team. Their best performance that year was an innings of 567 on a somewhat difficult pitch against Fielder and Blythe of Kent CCC.  After that year, however, the batting was never strong enough to make up for woefully weak bowling.

Worcestershire were so weak the club could not compete in the Championship in 1919, and their form in 1920 – when they lost three successive games by an innings and over 200 runs – was probably the worst of any county side. Their form, with one remarkable exception, was woeful up to the early thirties. Fred Root, one of the first exponents of leg theory bowling, took over 1,500 wickets for the county and was a Test standard player in an otherwise fourth-rate team. In Cyril Walters and the Nawab of Pataudi the team acquired its first class batsmen since the Fosters, but both had to give up the game after playing brilliantly in 1933 – when the bowling was briefly very weak.

The emergence of Dick Howorth and Reg Perks in the 1930s, however, was built up so well that by 1947 Worcestershire were sufficiently strong in bowling to be competitive at county level even if their batting was not adequate for high honours. Roly Jenkins, with 183 wickets in 1949, gave them briefly the best attack in county cricket, but they soon declined again and their form in the 1950s was indifferent at best.

Their first period of great success came in the 1960s under the Presidency of Sir George Dowty and the captaincy of Don Kenyon, when the county won two County Championships thanks to the achievements of such players as Norman Gifford, Tom Graveney, Jack Flavell, Len Coldwell and Basil D'Oliveira. They were also losing finalist in the first ever Gillette Cup Final in 1963 – the inaugural limited overs knockout competition in England. In 1971 Worcestershire won their first ever Sunday League title thanks largely to the bowling of Vanburn Holder and the New Zealander Glenn Turner was instrumental in Worcestershire's third championship win in 1974. In the 1980s, the prodigious batting feats of Graeme Hick and the arrival of Ian Botham paved the way for two more county titles in 1988 and 1989 – the same year in which they beat the touring Australians inside two days. Worcestershire also won the Sunday League in 1987 and 1988.

Worcestershire's success continued into the 1990s, with a first ever success in the Benson and Hedges Cup in 1991, following final defeats in 1973, 1976 and 1990. Captained by Phil Neale, the Pears beat Lancashire by 65 runs in the final at Lord's, gaining revenge for defeat against Lancashire in the previous year's competition. Worcestershire's next title came in 1994 when they won the Natwest Trophy, beating arch-rivals Warwickshire in the final. Not only did they avenge their defeat at the hands of Warwickshire in the B&H Cup Final earlier that summer but it was also their first success in the competition after three previous final defeats. Worcestershire's best showing in the County Championship came in 1993 when they finished second to Middlesex. Worcestershire finished 15th in 1999, the final year of single division County Championship cricket, meaning they would start the new millennium in Division Two.

The modern day (2000–present)
Worcestershire failed to gain promotion in 2000, despite overseas signing Glenn McGrath taking 76 Championship wickets at an average of 13.77. In 2003, Worcestershire were promoted to County Championship Division One for the first time after winning the Division Two title. Worcestershire also reached the final of the Cheltenham & Gloucester trophy, beating Lancashire in a memorable semi-final at New Road on 9 August 2003. There was disappointment in the Lord's final, though, as Worcestershire lost by seven wickets and the Pears were also relegated from Division One of the National League. 2004 was a yo-yo year with Worcestershire relegated in the County Championship, promoted back to Division One in the rebranded totesport League and losing finalists again in the C&G Trophy. Vikram Solanki scored centuries in both the semi-final win against Warwickshire and the final against Gloucestershire, but the 'Gladiators' won by eight wickets at Lord's.

In 2006, Worcestershire won promotion to the first division of the Championship on the last day of the season by beating Northamptonshire while their rivals for second promotion spot, Essex, lost to Leicestershire. However, their 2007 season began badly, including an innings-and-260-run loss to Yorkshire, Worcestershire's worst innings defeat since 1934.
A flood-hit season inflicted serious financial damage, and on-field results in the Championship gave little cheer as Worcestershire were relegated. However, in the Pro40 First Division things were very different, and victory over Gloucestershire in mid-September brought the title to New Road, the county's first trophy since 1994. The feat was all the more remarkable for the fact that every one of Worcestershire's games was played away from their New Road home, due to the floods, with 'home' games played at Edgbaston, Taunton and Kidderminster.

2008 saw Worcestershire promoted back to Division One, despite losing their final game of the season. 2008 was also Graeme Hick's last season at Worcestershire, having scored 136 first-class centuries in 25 seasons at New Road. 2009 proved disastrous in first-class cricket, with Worcestershire finishing bottom of the First Division without a single victory, the first time the county had failed to win a Championship match since 1928.

Following a win on the last day of the season against Sussex, Worcestershire were promoted back to Division One in 2010. The following season they avoided relegation for the first time ever, giving them consecutive seasons in Division One. However, at the end of the 2012 season they were relegated back to Division Two. Worcestershire had a mixed campaign in 2013, finished fifth out of nine in Division Two but a bright start to the 2014 saw them second in the table after seven games, following a draw with Surrey in June. Worcestershire returned to Division One for the 2015 season, however their return only lasted one season as they were relegated after picking up only two wins. Worcestershire spent two years back in the second tier, before achieving promotion on 27 September 2017.

Sponsorship

Players
Current squad
 No. denotes the player's squad number, as worn on the back of their shirt.
  denotes players with international caps.

Lists of players and club captains
 List of Worcestershire CCC players
 List of Worcestershire cricket captains

County caps awarded
Note: Worcestershire no longer award traditional caps, instead awarding "colours" on a player's Championship debut.

Grounds

This section gives details of every venue at which Worcestershire have hosted at least one match at first-class or List A level. Figures show the number of Worcestershire matches only played at the grounds listed, and do not include abandoned games. Note that the locations given are current; in some cases grounds now in other counties lie within the traditional boundaries of Worcestershire.

Haden Hill Park in Old Hill, West Midlands, was due to host a Benson & Hedges Cup match in 1988. However, this was abandoned without a ball being bowled and no other senior cricket has been played at the ground, so it is not included in the table.

Records
First-classMost first-class runs for Worcestershire 
Qualification – 20,000 runsMost first-class wickets for Worcestershire 
Qualification – 1,000 wickets

Batting
Highest team total: 701/6 declared v. Surrey, Worcester, 2007
Lowest team total: 24 v. Yorkshire, Huddersfield, 1903
Highest individual innings: 405* by Graeme Hick v. Somerset, Taunton, 1988
Most runs in a season: 2,654 by Harold Gibbons, 1934

Bowling
Best bowling in an innings: 9–23 by Fred Root v. Lancashire, Worcester, 1931
Best bowling in a match: 15–87 by Arthur Conway v. Gloucestershire, Moreton-in-Marsh, 1914
Most wickets in a season: 207 by Fred Root, 1925

Highest partnership for each wicket

1st: 309 by Frederick Bowley and Harry Foster v. Derbyshire, Derby, 1901
2nd: 316 by Stephen Moore and Vikram Solanki v. Gloucestershire, Cheltenham, 2008
3rd: 438* by Graeme Hick and Tom Moody v. Hampshire, Southampton, 1997
4th: 330 by Ben Smith and Graeme Hick v. Somerset, Taunton, 2006
5th: 393 by Ted Arnold and William Burns v. Warwickshire, Birmingham, 1909
6th: 265 by Graeme Hick and Steve Rhodes v. Somerset, Taunton, 1988
7th: 256 by David Leatherdale and Steve Rhodes v. Nottinghamshire, Nottingham, 2002
8th: 184 by Steve Rhodes and Stuart Lampitt v. Derbyshire, Kidderminster, 1991
9th: 181 by John Cuffe and Robert Burrows v. Gloucestershire, Worcester, 1907
10th: 136 by Alex Milton and Steve Magoffin v. Somerset, Worcester, 2018

List A
Highest team total: 404/3 (60 overs) v. Devon, Worcester, 1987
Lowest team total: 58 all out (20.3 overs) v. Ireland, Worcester, 2009
Highest individual innings: 192 by Callum Ferguson v. Leicestershire, New Road, 2018
Best bowling: 7–19 by Neal Radford v. Bedfordshire, Bedford, 1991

Fostershire

'Fostershire'' was a name jocularly applied to Worcestershire County Cricket Club in the early part of the 20th century, shortly after the county had achieved first-class status and admission into the English County Championship (in 1899). The name came from the fact that seven brothers from this one family played for Worcestershire during the period 1899–1934, three of whom captained the club at some point. Six of the brothers appeared during the seasons 1908–11.

References

Further reading
H S Altham, A History of Cricket, Volume 1 (to 1914), George Allen & Unwin, 1962
Derek Birley, A Social History of English Cricket, Aurum, 1999
Rowland Bowen, Cricket: A History of its Growth and Development, Eyre & Spottiswoode, 1970
Roy Webber, The Playfair Book of Cricket Records'', Playfair Books, 1951
Playfair Cricket Annual – various editions
Wisden Cricketers' Almanack – various editions

External links
Worcestershire County Cricket Club Official Website
Worcestershire CCC history
Grounds in England from CricketArchive. Retrieved 9 December 2006.
Worcestershire CCC Fans' Forum

 
Cricket clubs established in 1865
English first-class cricket teams
Cricket in Worcestershire
Sport in Worcester, England
History of Worcestershire
1865 establishments in England